Elachista laquaeorum is a species of moth in the family Elachistidae. It was described by John S. Dugdale in 1971. It is found on the Snares Islands south of New Zealand.

The wingspan is 6.4-6.6 mm. The ground colour of the forewings is yellow fawn with two brown or blackish-brown longitudinal stripes. The hindwings are clothed in yellow-fawn scales.

References

Moths described in 1971
laquaeorum
Moths of New Zealand
Endemic fauna of New Zealand
Endemic moths of New Zealand